Lau Province is one of fourteen provinces of Fiji. Its capital is at Tubou, at the southern end of the island of Lakeba. The province forms part of the country's Eastern Division (which also includes the provinces of Kadavu and Lomaiviti), and of the Tovata Confederacy, a traditional hierarchy of chiefs from northern and eastern Fiji.

Geographically it consists of the Lau Archipelago. The Lau group comprises 60-some islands and has a total land area of 487 square kilometers. At the most recent census in 2017, it had a population of 9,602, making it the third-least populous province.

References

 
Provinces of Fiji